The Beryl class is a series of 7 container ships  built for Niki Shipping and operated by Mediterranean Shipping Company. The ships were built by STX Offshore & Shipbuilding in South Korea and have a maximum theoretical capacity of around 12,991 twenty-foot equivalent units (TEU). The initial order was for a total of 9 ships, but only 7 were actually built.

List of ships

References 

Container ship classes